Probable E3 ubiquitin-protein ligase HERC3 is an enzyme that in humans is encoded by the HERC3 gene. The gene is a member of the HERC family of ubiquitin ligases and encodes a protein with a HECT domain and an RCC1-like domain (RLD). It binds ubiquitin and hPLIC-1/2 via its HECT domain. Alternatively spiced transcript variants encoding multiple isoforms have been observed, and mutations in this gene have been linked to colorectal and gastric carcinomas. The protein is localized in the cytosol and vesicular-like structures containing β-COP, ARF, and Rab5. Since HERC3 can itself be ubiquitinated and degraded by the proteasome, it likely has roles in both vesicular traffic and ubiquitin-dependent processes.

References

Further reading

Genes